Snagit (formerly SnagIt) is screen capture and screen recording software for Windows and macOS. It is created and developed by TechSmith and was first launched in 1990. Snagit is available in English, French, German, Japanese, Portuguese and Spanish versions.

Snagit replaces the native print screen function and extends it with additional features.

Features
The features are structured around the three main steps of the software workflow: capture, edit and share.

First step is to capture an image (or record a video) with Snagit Capture. This is accomplished through a variety of image capture methods, including fullscreen selection, specific region selection, menu selection, text recognition (OCR with Grab text) and panoramic selection. Alternatively, the software can record a video (from a specific region or fullscreen).

Second step is to edit into Snagit Editor the captured image where it can be resized, annotated or given some other effects (borders...). Another feature is to create a video from captured images (narrating a set of screenshots).

Third step is to share the produced image (or video), as a local file (PNG, JPEG, HEIF, WebP, MP4...), to another application (Microsoft Outlook, Apple Mail, Camtasia...) or to upload it online (YouTube, Google Drive, FTP...).

Although most of the main features are identical between the two versions of the software (Windows and Mac), there are some effects that are specific to one or the other version  (e.g. watermark effect is only available on Windows and reflection effect is only available on Mac).

Snagit Capture
Snagit Capture (Capture Window & Widget) is the image and video capturing program of Snagit. Hotkeys (Windows) and Shortcuts (Mac) are available to speed up the capture process.

Snagit
Snagit includes Snagit Editor, which is Snagit's image and video editing program. The editor can be used to make changes to screenshots, including adding arrows, annotations and callouts. Other features of the software allow the creation of tutorials (using the Step tool and/or using the Simplify tool, which allows you to create Simplified User Interfaces) and offer guarantees of confidentiality (blurring areas, cropping images). Video editing features are basic and limited (trimming videos). 

Snagit also includes the Library (to store the edited images and videos) and the Sharing Destinations (to publish images and videos).

Snagit Capture File .snagx is a cross-platform compatible file format used to store images captures (both on Windows and Mac). Snagit 2021 (and earlier versions) stored image captures in .snag (Windows) and .snagproj (Mac) formats (these two file formats were not compatible).

Videos recordings are stored in .mp4 format in Snagit Library.

TechSmith Fuse (Android and iOS)
Snagit can connect through Wi-Fi to TechSmith Fuse app. Images, videos and screen recordings stored on mobile devices can be sent directly to Snagit Library.

See also
 Snipping Tool, Microsoft Windows official screenshot capture tool
 Screenshot app, Apple macOS official screenshot capture tool
 Comparison of screencasting software
 Presentation slide
 Technical writing

References

External links
 

Screenshot software
Screencasting software
Windows multimedia software
MacOS software